Amarna letter EA 75, titled: "Political Chaos", is a short to moderate length letter from Rib-Hadda, who wrote the largest number of Amarna letters in a sub-corpus, from the city-state of Byblos; Byblos contained an Ancient Egyptian colony, and was aligned with a few neighboring townsites.

EA 75 is damaged with a few lines missing on the Bottom, Obverse, and parts of line endings, and beginnings, but the topic of the letter is extensive — explaining the conflict with 'Apiru/Habiru and also major Great King states of the region (Hatti(Hattusa) and Mitanni).

After a short Introduction to the Pharaoh, the dire straits of the city-state are related. Possessions are sold in Yarimuta to stay alive, and the Habiru warfare has reduced the town's people to conduct daily life: "...My field is "a wife without a husband", lacking in cultivation."

The Amarna letters, about 300, numbered up to EA 382, are a mid 14th century BC, about 1360 BC and 30–35 years later, correspondence. The initial corpus of letters were found at Akhenaten's city Akhetaten, in the floor of the Bureau of Correspondence of Pharaoh; others were later found, adding to the body of letters.

Note: there are two missing lines at the letter's Bottom, Obverse. Also at the letter's end, but final sentences are made at the tablet's left edge, partially damaged.

Letter EA 75 (also see here-(Obverse & Reverse, etc.)), is numbered C 4757 (12191), from the Cairo Museum.

Cuneiform and Akkadian
The cuneiform of EA 75, and the Akkadian text.

Obverse

Paragraph Ia
(Line 1)—[ Diš ]-Ri-iB-aD-Da [ iq-bi ]–.–.–.–(.. (m)(Male)Rib-Hadda .. Speaking ! )
(2)—[ a ]-na EN-šu lugal -/- ["kur-kur lugal gal" ]–.–( to Lord-his .. King (of) Lands ! )
(3)—dnin ša iri [ GUB-La ]–.–.–.–.–.–( --///-- Mistress "which of" City-stateByblos (Gubla) --//-- )
(4)—ti-din kal-ga a-[-na lugal EN-ia ]–.–( ... "Proclaim"(Know) Strength(Power) For(To) Lord-mine !,... )
(5)—a-na GÌRI-MEŠ -//- EN-ia dutu-ia–.–(.. at Feet(S) -//- Lord-mine GodSun-mine,.. )
(6)—7(diš)-šu 7diš-a-an am-qú-ut {{ [?? lu-ú ??] }}—.—( 7 (times and) 7 times,.. -/- "I bow" ! ("I address you"?) )

Paragraph Ib
(7)—[ i-]-de lugal EN-li -//- i-nu-[ ma .. ]—/—( .. Know,.. King Lord-(li) --//-- Now(Now, at this time)... )
(8)—šal-ma-at iriGUB-LA géme-ka–.–.–.–(.. "is Peaceful" CityGubla .. "Handmaid"-yours )
(9)—ìš-tu da-ri-it u4-kàm-meš–.–.–.–( .. From Forever - "Time" ! )

Paragraph Ic
(10)—ša-ni-tam ga-kal nu-kúr ša erìn-GAZ-MEŠ–.–.–( However, (the) "warfare" "which of" ARMY'Apiru (Habiru) ... )

Akkadian 

Obverse

Paragraph Ia
(Line 1)—[ Diš ]-Rib-Hadda [ qabû ]
(2)—[ a ]-na Bēlu-šu lugal [kur-kur(mâtâti) lugal gal ]
(3)—dnin ša iri [ GUB-LA ]
(4)—idû kal-ga(=dannu) a[na lugal EN-ia ]
(5)—ana GÌRI-MEŠ(šêpê) -//- Beli-ia dutu-ia
(6)—7(diš)-šu 7diš-a-an maqātu [?? lu-ú ??]

Paragraph Ib
(7)—[ i ]-dû lugal EN-li -//- inü[ ma .. ]
(8)—šalāmu iriGUBLa géme-ka
(9)—ìštu dār u4-kàm-meš

Paragraph Ic
(10)—šanitam ga-kal nukurtu ša erìn-GAZ-MEŠ

The Habiru/'Apiru

The mention of the Habiru shows the conflict of the time, as the takeover of city-states or regions by the Habiru. The map shows various cities and regions, and their respective dealings with the Habiru. (There are only 3 letters from Labaya of Šakmu/Shechem.) The next closest mention of the Habiru is from the Jerusalem letters of Abdi-Heba, directly south at Jerusalem, letters EA 286, 287, 288, 289, and EA 290.

Spellings for Habiru in the Amarna letters

EA 75, l. 10—šanitam ga-kal nukurtu ša erìn-GAZ-MEŠ–.–( However, "warfare" "which of" "ARMY"'Apiru (Habiru) ... )
EA 100, l. 26—KUR,.. ša ìl-qú LÚ.MEŠ GAZ,.. [ ištu ]–.]–( LÚ-MEŠ GAZ )
EA 271, l. 16—..lú-meš Sa-GaZ-meš .. ( Men (pl), SA.GAZMEŠ(pl)
EA 290, l. 24—..Ha-Pí-Ri .. ( Hapiru ( 'Apiru ))
EA 299, l. 18—..da-an-nu LÚ-SA-GAZ-meš .. ( "Strengthening" - LÚ.SA.GAZ.MEŠ ..( "Strengthening Habiru" )
EA 366, l. 21—.. {LÚ} SA-GAZ .. ( LÚSA-GAZ (Habiru))

See also
Rib-Hadda
Byblos
Amarna letters–phrases and quotations

References

Moran, William L. The Amarna Letters. Johns Hopkins University Press, 1987, 1992. (softcover)
 Parpola, 1971. The Standard Babylonian Epic of Gilgamesh, Parpola, Simo, Neo-Assyrian Text Corpus Project, c 1997, Tablet I thru Tablet XII, Index of Names, Sign List, and Glossary-(pp. 119–145), 165 pages.

External links
Line drawing of EA 75, Obverse & Reverse
Line Drawing, cuneiform, and Akkadian, EA 75: Obverse & Reverse, CDLI no. P270987 (Chicago Digital Library Initiative)
CDLI listing of all EA Amarna letters, 1-382

Hanson Letter 75 
Rib-Hadda letter no. 75

Amarna letters
History of Byblos